Semites, Semitic peoples or Semitic cultures is an obsolete term for an ethnic, cultural or racial group. The terminology is now largely unused outside the grouping "Semitic languages" in linguistics.

First used in the 1770s by members of the Göttingen School of History, this biblical terminology for race was derived from Shem, one of the three sons of Noah in the Book of Genesis, together with the parallel terms Hamites and Japhetites.

In archaeology, the term is sometimes used informally as "a kind of shorthand" for ancient Semitic-speaking peoples.

Ethnicity and race

The term Semitic in a racial sense was coined by members of the Göttingen School of History in the early 1770s. Other members of the Göttingen School of History coined the separate term Caucasian in the 1780s. These terms were used and developed by numerous other scholars over the next century. In the early 20th century, the racialist classifications of Carleton S. Coon included the Semitic peoples in the Caucasian race, as similar in appearance to the Indo-European, Northwest Caucasian, and Kartvelian-speaking peoples. Due to the interweaving of language studies and cultural studies, the term also came to be applied to the religions (ancient Semitic and Abrahamic) and ethnicities of various cultures associated by geographic and linguistic distribution.

Antisemitism

The terms "anti-Semite" or "antisemitism" came by a circuitous route to refer more narrowly to anyone who was hostile or discriminatory towards Jews in particular.

Anthropologists of the 19th century such as Ernest Renan readily aligned linguistic groupings with ethnicity and culture, appealing to anecdote, science and folklore in their efforts to define racial character. Moritz Steinschneider, in his periodical of Jewish letters Hamaskir (3 (Berlin 1860), 16), discusses an article by Heymann Steinthal criticising Renan's article "New Considerations on the General Character of the Semitic Peoples, In Particular Their Tendency to Monotheism". Renan had acknowledged the importance of the ancient civilisations of Mesopotamia, Israel etc. but called the Semitic races inferior to the Aryan for their monotheism, which he held to arise from their supposed lustful, violent, unscrupulous and selfish racial instincts. Steinthal summed up these predispositions as "Semitism", and so Steinschneider characterised Renan's ideas as "anti-Semitic prejudice".

In 1879, the German journalist Wilhelm Marr began the politicisation of the term by speaking of a struggle between Jews and Germans in a pamphlet called Der Weg zum Siege des Germanenthums über das Judenthum ("The Way to Victory of Germanism over Judaism"). He accused the Jews of being liberals, a people without roots who had Judaized Germans beyond salvation. In 1879, Marr's adherents founded the "League for Anti-Semitism", which concerned itself entirely with anti-Jewish political action.

Objections to the usage of the term, such as the obsolete nature of the term "Semitic" as a racial term, have been raised since at least the 1930s.

See also
 Ancient Semitic-speaking peoples
 Generations of Noah
 Hamites
 Japhetites

References

Bibliography

External links

Semitic genetics
Semitic language family tree included under "Afro-Asiatic" in SIL's Ethnologue.
The south Arabian origin of ancient Arabs
The Edomite Hyksos connection 
The perished Arabs
The Midianites of the north
Ancient Semitic peoples (video)

 
Historical definitions of race
Islam and Judaism
Shem